The following is a list of notable assassinations of the Second JVP Insurrection, most of which were carried out by the Janatha Vimukthi Peramuna or by government security forces.

Politicians

JVP leaders

Journalists

Academics

Professionals

Police and Military officers

Activists

See also
 List of assassinations of the Sri Lankan Civil War
 1987 grenade attack in the Sri Lankan Parliament
 1989 Temple of the Tooth attack

References

 
Janatha Vimukthi Peramuna
Ski Lanka
1987–1989 JVP insurrection